The 1991 Women's World Water Polo Championship was the second edition of the women's water polo tournament at the World Aquatics Championships, organised by the world governing body in aquatics, the FINA. The tournament was held from 3 to 13 January 1991, and was incorporated into the 1991 World Aquatics Championships in Perth, Western Australia.

Teams

GROUP A

GROUP B

Preliminary round

GROUP A

GROUP B

Final round

GROUP C

Final ranking

Individual awards
Most Valuable Player
???

Best Goalkeeper
???

Medalists

References

 Results

1991
Women's tournament
1991 in women's water polo
Women's water polo in Australia
1991 in Australian women's sport